Kfar Silwan (also spelled Kfar Selouane, Kfarselwan or Kfar Silwen) is a municipality in the Baabda District of Mount Lebanon Governorate, Lebanon. It had 2,736 registered voters in 2010. Its inhabitants are predominantly Maronites and Druze.

History
Kfar Silwan was the ancestral village of the Abu'l-Lama muqaddams (local chiefs), a Druze family affiliated with Fakhr al-Din II, which later moved to Mtain and Salima and embraced Maronite Christianity. The village later served as the headquarters of the Banu Hatum, a Druze clan. From Kafr Silwan, the Banu Hatum led a peasants' revolt in the early 1790s against the taxation attempts of Bashir Shihab II, the paramount tax farmer of Mount Lebanon and its environs, forcing his troops to withdraw from the Matn area. In 1794 the revolt was suppressed by the forces of the Ottoman governor Jazzar Pasha, the village was destroyed and part of its inhabitants, including the Banu Hatum, migrated to the Hauran.

In 1838, Eli Smith noted  Kefr Selwan as a village located in Aklim el-Metn; East of Beirut.

See also
 Druze in Lebanon
 Maronite Church in Lebanon

References

Bibliography

 

Maronite Christian communities in Lebanon
Druze communities in Lebanon
Populated places in Baabda District